Naryn Region is the largest region (oblus) of Kyrgyzstan. It is located in the east of the country and borders with Chüy Region in the north, Issyk-Kul Region in the northeast, Xinjiang Uyghur Autonomous Region of China in the southeast, Osh Region in the southwest, and Jalal-Abad Region in the west. Its capital is Naryn. The resident population of the region was 292,140 as of January 2021.

The main highway runs from the Chinese border at Torugart Pass north to Balykchy on Issyk-Kul Lake. It is known as the location of Song Köl Lake and Chatyr-Kul Lake and Tash Rabat.

The population of Naryn oblast is 99% Kyrgyz. The economy is dominated by animal herding (sheep, horses, yaks), with wool and meat as the main products.  Mining of various minerals developed during the Soviet era has largely been abandoned as uneconomical. Today the oblast is considered to be the poorest region in the country, but also the most typically Kyrgyz. It boasts beautiful mountains, alpine pastures, and Song Köl Lake which during summer months attracts large herds of sheep and horses with their herders and yurts.

History
The region was established on 21 November 1939 as Tien-Shan Region. On 20 December 1962, the region was dissolved, but on 11 December 1970 it was re-established as Naryn Region. On 5 October 1988 it was merged into Issyk-Kul Region, and, finally, on 14 December 1990, the Naryn Region was re-established.

Divisions
The Naryn Region is divided administratively into one city of regional significance (Naryn) and five districts:

Naryn Region contains no cities of district significance and no urban-type settlements.

Demographics
The population of Naryn Region, according to the Population and Housing Census of 2009 amounted to 245.3 thousand (enumerated de facto population) or 257.8 thousand (de jure population). The region's population estimate for the beginning of 2021 was 292,140.

Ethnic composition
According to the 2009 Census, the ethnic composition of the Naryn Region (de jure population) was:

Basic socio-economic indicators

The economically active population of Naryn Region in 2009 was 106,673, of which 96,862 employed and 9,811 (9.2%) unemployed. 

 Export: 0.9 million US dollars (2008)
 Import: 4.0 million US dollars (2008)
 Direct Foreign Investments: 1,1 million US dollars (in 2008)

References

Works cited
Laurence Mitchell, Kyrgyzstan, Bradt Travel Guides, 2008

 
Regions of Kyrgyzstan